Anichangkuppam is an Indian village situated in East coast Road from Pondicherry to Chennai, also called as Nambikkai nallure.
  
There are around 350 families living in this village.

Villages in Viluppuram district